Fabriciana xipe is an East Palearctic butterfly in the family Nymphalidae (Heliconiinae). 

It is found in  Altai - Ussuri, China, Mongolia and  Korea. The habitat is steppe. They fly in July and August.

References

Fabriciana
Butterflies described in 1891